Chocolate River may refer to:
Chocolate River, an alternate name for the Petitcodiac River
Chocolate River Conservatory of Music
Chocolate River, a fictional river of Wonka's Chocolate Factory in Charlie and the Chocolate Factory